Matthew Gray (born 16 September 1981) is an English professional football manager and former player who is the current head coach of the EFL League Two club Sutton United.

Playing career
A youth product of Tottenham Hotspur and Cardiff City, Gray had an unassuming senior career in the National League. He began his senior career at Barnet, with stints at Hayes, and Havant & Waterlooville where he was appointed the captain. He ended his playing career at 25, due to various injuries.

Coaching career
After retiring as a footballer, Gray began coaching. His first stints were as the assistant manager at Eastleigh. He was also the assistant with EFL League Two clubs Aldershot Town and Crawley Town. In December 2018, he was appointed as one of the coaches at Sutton United.

On 22 April 2019, the long-term Sutton United manager Paul Doswell stepped down. Matt Gray was appointed interim manager for the last matchday that season in the National League alongside Ian Baird, and Micky Stephens. On 1 May 2019, he was formally appointed as the manager for the team. In the 2020–21 season, his second with Sutton United, Gray led the team to promotion into the English Football League for the first time in their 123-year history. He was named the National League manager of the year for the 2020–21 season.

Managerial Statistics

Honours

Manager
Sutton United
National League: 2020–21
EFL Trophy runner-up: 2021–22

Individual
National League Manager of the Year: 2020–21

References

External links
 
 

1981 births
Living people
Footballers from Greater London
English footballers
English football managers
National League (English football) players
National League (English football) managers
English Football League managers
Association football defenders
Barnet F.C. players
Hayes F.C. players
Havant & Waterlooville F.C. players
Aldershot Town F.C. non-playing staff
Crawley Town F.C. non-playing staff
Sutton United F.C. managers